The 1954 Princeton Tigers football team was an American football team that represented Princeton University during the 1954 college football season. In their tenth year under head coach Charlie Caldwell, the Tigers compiled a 5–3–1 record and outscored opponents 182 to 124. Jack Henn was the team captain.

Princeton played its home games at Palmer Stadium on the university campus in Princeton, New Jersey.

Schedule

References

Princeton
Princeton Tigers football seasons
Princeton Tigers football